Crown Street Halt railway station (also known as Silverdale (Crown Street) Halt) is a disused railway station in Staffordshire, England.

Situated closer to Silverdale town centre than Silverdale station, the station remained open until 1949.

Present day

Nothing remains of the halt site, but a signal post is still in situ and some old fencing but the halt site is now a greenway and park.

References
Notes

Sources
 
 

Disused railway stations in Stoke-on-Trent
Former North Staffordshire Railway stations
Railway stations in Great Britain closed in 1949
Railway stations in Great Britain opened in 1905